The J.L. Noble School was a historic school building located in the Juniata neighborhood of Altoona, Pennsylvania, United States.  It was built in 1912, and was a two-story, yellow brick building with cut brownstone detailing in the Renaissance Revival style.  An annex was built in 1929.

It was added to the National Register of Historic Places in 1996.

References

School buildings on the National Register of Historic Places in Pennsylvania
Renaissance Revival architecture in Pennsylvania
School buildings completed in 1912
Buildings and structures in Altoona, Pennsylvania
1912 establishments in Pennsylvania
Altoona, Pennsylvania
National Register of Historic Places in Blair County, Pennsylvania